The Beat Fleet, also known as TBF, is a band from Split, Croatia, founded in 1990. Members of the band are: Aleksandar Antić (vocals, lyrics, samples, accordion), Mladen Badovinac (vocal, samples), Luka Barbić (vocals, keyboards, samples), Ognjen Pavlović (bass guitar), Nikša Mandalinić (electric guitar), and Nikola Vidović (drums). They published six albums.

The Beat Fleet are widely considered to be one of the most innovative experimental bands in Croatia and wider area. They are heavily influenced by reggae, the British trip hop scene, electronic and experimental music. With years their built new style of music was named ping pong. Ping pong is a mixture of reggae, afro beat, hip hop, rap rock, alternative rock, dub and British trip hop.

In 2017, former TBF member Nikola Čelan released Baština (Legacy), a book about the emergence of the hip hop scene in Split, as well as the forming years of TBF.

Discography 

 Ping-Pong (Umjetnost zdravog đira) (1997, Croatia Records)
 Uskladimo toplomjere (2000, Menart Records)
 Maxon Universal (2004, Menart Records)
 Galerija Tutnplok (2007, Menart Records)
 Perpetuum Fritule (2010, Dallas Records - live album)
 Pistaccio Metallic (2011, Dallas Records)
 Danas sutra (2015, Dallas Records)

References

External links

Official FanPage on Facebook
Official website 
The Beat Fleet 

Croatian hip hop groups
Musical groups established in 1990
Musicians from Split, Croatia